Bénédicte Pételle (née Billaudel; born 4 June 1971) is a French politician and former schoolteacher. She became the Member of Parliament for Hauts-de-Seine's 2nd constituency in 2019 when Adrien Taquet was appointed to the Second Philippe government.

Political career 
In the 2017 French legislative election, she was the substitute candidate for Adrien Taquet. She joined Parliament when he was made Secretary of State for Child protection by Prime Minister Édouard Philippe.

She sat in the La République En Marche group in the National Assembly and was affiliated with En Commun.

She did not seek re-election in the 2022 French legislative election, after being dismissed by her party.

Personal life 
She is a committed catholic and is mother to five children. Her father died in the COVID-19 pandemic in France.

References 

1971 births
Living people
Paris Nanterre University alumni
La République En Marche! politicians

People from Hauts-de-Seine
French schoolteachers
French Catholics
Politicians from Île-de-France
21st-century French women politicians
21st-century French politicians
Women members of the National Assembly (France)
Deputies of the 15th National Assembly of the French Fifth Republic
Members of Parliament for Hauts-de-Seine